Baritone is a type of classical male singing voice whose vocal range lies between the bass and the tenor voice type

Baritone may also refer to:

Brass and woodwind instruments
Baritone horn, a low-pitched brass instrument in the saxhorn family
Baritone saxophone, one of the largest members of the saxophone family
Hautbois baryton, or baritone oboe, also called the bass oboe
Baritone sarrusophone, a double reed instrument

String instruments
Baritone guitar, a guitar with a longer scale length
Baritone ukulele
a possible alternate spelling of the stringed musical instrument called Baryton
Baritone violin, with the same tuning as a cello but larger in size

Other uses
Bass-baritone, a low baritone with notes in the bass range